The Rural Municipality of Langford is a former rural municipality (RM) in the Canadian province of Manitoba. It was originally incorporated as a rural municipality on November 1, 1890. It ceased on January 1, 2015 as a result of its provincially mandated amalgamation with the RM of North Cypress to form the Municipality of North Cypress – Langford.

The former RM surrounded the separately administered Town of Neepawa.

Communities 
 Hallboro
 Mentmore

References

External links 
 Map of Langford R.M. at Statcan

Langford
Populated places disestablished in 2015
2015 disestablishments in Manitoba